The 2001 Chicago Cubs season was the 130th season of the Chicago Cubs franchise, the 126th in the National League and the 86th at Wrigley Field. The Cubs finished third in the National League Central with a record of 88–74.

Offseason
November 18, 2000: Bill Mueller was traded by the San Francisco Giants to the Chicago Cubs for Tim Worrell.
December 18, 2000: Jason Bere was signed as a free agent with the Chicago Cubs.
 December 19, 2000: Todd Hundley signed as a free agent with the Chicago Cubs.
 January 10, 2001: Ron Coomer was signed as a free agent with the Chicago Cubs.

Regular season
During a forgettable 2000 season, Jim Hendry sent pitcher Scott Downs to Montreal and acquired Rondell White. This laid the groundwork for the 2001 season, which saw the North Siders make another drive for the playoffs. Mack Newton was brought in by the club to preach "positive mental thought",  and it paid off. Matt Stairs started the season at first base, but ultimately the Cubs made a mid-June trade to acquire All-Star 1B Fred McGriff, though McGriff took over a month debating whether or not to approve the deal and leave his hometown Tampa Bay Devil Rays, ultimately waiving his no-trade clause and allow himself to be dealt to Chicago on July 27. "The Crime Dog" hit a respectable .282 with 12 homers in 49 games with the Cubs, hitting cleanup behind Sammy Sosa, who had perhaps his best season, hitting 64 homers with career highs in batting average (.328) and RBI (160) for Don Baylor's club. Jon Lieber had a 20 win season, and along with Kevin Tapani and Kerry Wood made up a solid rotation. The Cubs led the eventual Wild Card winning Cardinals by 2.5 games in early September, but Preston Wilson's walk-off homer off of closer Tom "Flash" Gordon took the wind out of the team's sails, failing to make another serious charge. The Cubs did manage to finish 88–74, only 5 games behind both St. Louis and Houston, who tied for first.
One of the season's most memorable moments came on September 27, when Sammy Sosa carried an American flag around the bases after hitting a home run in the Cubs first home game since the September 11 attacks.

Season standings

Record vs. opponents

Transactions
July 4, 2001: Trenidad Hubbard was signed as a free agent with the Chicago Cubs.
July 30, 2001: Dave Weathers was traded by the Milwaukee Brewers with Roberto Miniel (minors) to the Chicago Cubs for Ruben Quevedo and Pete Zoccolillo.
September 10, 2001: Trenidad Hubbard was released by the Chicago Cubs.

Draft picks
June 5, 2001: Mark Prior was drafted by the Chicago Cubs in the 1st round (2nd pick) of the 2001 amateur draft. Player signed August 23, 2001.
June 5, 2001: Geovany Soto was drafted by the Chicago Cubs in the 11th round of the 2001 amateur draft. Player signed June 26, 2001.

Roster

Player stats

Batting

Starters by position
Note: Pos = Position; G = Games played; AB = At bats; H = Hits; Avg. = Batting average; HR = Home runs; RBI = Runs batted in

Other batters
Note: G = Games played; AB = At bats; H = Hits; Avg. = Batting average; HR = Home runs; RBI = Runs batted in

Pitching

Starting pitchers
Note: G = Games pitched; IP = Innings pitched; W = Wins; L = Losses; ERA = Earned run average; SO = Strikeouts

Other pitchers
Note: G = Games pitched; IP = Innings pitched; W = Wins; L = Losses; ERA = Earned run average; SO = Strikeouts

Relief pitchers
Note: G = Games pitched; W = Wins; L = Losses; SV = Saves; ERA = Earned run average; SO = Strikeouts

Awards and records
Sammy Sosa became the first player to hit at least 60 home runs in three different seasons.

Farm system

References

2001 Chicago Cubs season at Baseball Reference

Chicago Cubs seasons
Chicago Cubs season
Cub